Laura Schiavone (born 13 October 1986) is an Italian rower who competed in the women's double sculls event at the 2008 Summer Olympics. She is also a medal winner at senior level at the European Rowing Championships.

References

External links
 

1986 births
Living people
Italian female rowers
Olympic rowers of Italy
Rowers at the 2008 Summer Olympics
Rowers from Naples